NA-271 (Kharan-cum-Panjgur) was a constituency for the National Assembly of Pakistan. It discontinued in 2018 and was replaced by NA-268 (Chagai-cum-Nushki-cum-Kharan) and NA-270 (Panjgur-cum-Washuk-cum-Awaran). NA-271 areas from Kharan District were added to NA-268 while areas from Panjgur District were added to NA-270. Both of these constituencies were created in 2018.

Election 2002 

General elections were held on 10 Oct 2002. Moulvi Rehmatullah of Muttahida Majlis-e-Amal won by 25,775 votes.

Election 2008 

General elections were held on 18 Feb 2008. Lieutenant General (R) Abdul Qadir Baloch an Independent candidate won by 22,175 votes.

Election 2013 

General elections were held on 11 May 2013. Lieutenant General (R) Abdul Qadir Baloch of PML-N won by 7,388 votes and became the member of National Assembly.

References

External links 
Election result's official website

NA-271
Abolished National Assembly Constituencies of Pakistan